The Emperor of Mexico (Spanish: Emperador de México) was the head of state and ruler of Mexico on two non-consecutive occasions in the 19th century.

With the Declaration of Independence of the Mexican Empire from Spain in 1821, Mexico became an independent monarchy—the First Mexican Empire (1822–1823). Mexico briefly reverted into a monarchy in the 1860s, during the Second Mexican Empire (1864–1867). In both instances of Empire, the reigning Emperor was forcibly deposed and then executed.

First Mexican Empire (1821–1823)

Decree 
The Sovereign Mexican Constituent Congress decreed on June 22, 1822 the following:

Second Mexican Empire (1863–1867)

Decree 
The Superior Government Junta by the Conservative Party decreed on July 11, 1863 the following:

See also
Pretenders to the throne of Mexico
Regency of the Mexican Empire
Empress of Mexico
Imperial Crown of Mexico
Mexican Imperial Orders
List of heads of state of Mexico

References

 
Mexican Empire
19th-century monarchs in North America
Mexico, Emperors
Titles of nobility in the Americas